It Can Be Done is a 1921 American silent comedy film directed by David Smith and starring Earle Williams, Elinor Fair, Henry A. Barrows, Jack Mathis, and Jack Carlyle. The film was released by Vitagraph Company of America in March 1921.

Cast
Earle Williams as Austin Crane
Elinor Fair as Eve Standish
Henry A. Barrows as Webb Standish (as Henry Barrows)
Jack Mathis as Jasper Braden (as Jack Mathies)
Jack Carlyle as Bill Donahue (as Jack Carlisle)
Alfred Aldridge as Spike Dawson
William McCall as Byron Tingley
Florence Hart as Mrs. Standish
Mary Huntress as Mrs. Faire

Preservation
The film is now considered lost.

References

External links

1921 comedy films
Silent American comedy films
1921 films
American silent feature films
American black-and-white films
Vitagraph Studios films
Lost American films
1921 lost films
Lost comedy films
1920s American films